Jimmi is a village in Bo District in the Southern Province of Sierra Leone.  It lies along the Mapandi River.

Villages in Sierra Leone